The Federação Norte-rio-grandense de Futebol (English: Football Association of Rio Grande do Norte state) was founded on July 14, 1918, and it manages all the official football tournaments within the state of Rio Grande do Norte, which are the Campeonato Potiguar, the Campeonato Potiguar lower levels and the Copa RN, and represents the clubs at the Brazilian Football Confederation (CBF).

References

Norteriograndense
Football in Rio Grande do Norte
Sports organizations established in 1918
1918 establishments in Brazil